Licking Township is a township in Clarion County, Pennsylvania, United States. The population was 575 at the 2020 census, an increase from the figure of 536 tabulated in 2010.

Geography
The township is located in western Clarion County. The Clarion River winds through the township, forming part of the northern border and part of the western border but also bending southwards to pass through the center of the township, past the borough of Callensburg, a separate municipality surrounded by the township. Licking Creek joins the Clarion River at Callensburg.

Demographics

As of the census of 2000, there were 479 people, 183 households, and 135 families residing in the township.  The population density was 27.5 people per square mile (10.6/km2).  There were 235 housing units at an average density of 13.5/sq mi (5.2/km2).  The racial makeup of the township was 99.16% White, 0.21% African American, and 0.63% from two or more races.

There were 183 households, out of which 29.5% had children under the age of 18 living with them, 59.6% were married couples living together, 9.3% had a female householder with no husband present, and 25.7% were non-families. 21.9% of all households were made up of individuals, and 9.3% had someone living alone who was 65 years of age or older.  The average household size was 2.62 and the average family size was 2.98.

In the township the population was spread out, with 24.6% under the age of 18, 9.8% from 18 to 24, 26.7% from 25 to 44, 24.6% from 45 to 64, and 14.2% who were 65 years of age or older.  The median age was 37 years. For every 100 females there were 103.8 males.  For every 100 females age 18 and over, there were 108.7 males.

The median income for a household in the township was $27,708, and the median income for a family was $33,250. Males had a median income of $29,444 versus $15,500 for females. The per capita income for the township was $15,553.  About 15.1% of families and 18.0% of the population were below the poverty line, including 24.8% of those under age 18 and 12.3% of those age 65 or over.

References

External links

Licking Township listing at Clarion County Association of Township Officials

Populated places established in 1804
Townships in Clarion County, Pennsylvania